The 1988 Virginia Cavaliers football team represented the University of Virginia during the 1988 NCAA Division I-A football season. The Cavaliers were led by seventh-year head coach George Welsh and played their home games at Scott Stadium in Charlottesville, Virginia. They competed as members of the Atlantic Coast Conference, finishing in second.

Schedule

Roster

References

Virginia
Virginia Cavaliers football seasons
Virginia Cavaliers football